Kungsholmen (King's Islet) is a borough (stadsdelsområde) in central Stockholm, Sweden. It is named after the dominating district and island in the borough. 
Except Kungsholmen (proper) there are six districts in the borough: Fredhäll, Kristineberg, Lilla Essingen, Marieberg, Stadshagen and Stora Essingen. It is also equivalent to the parishes of Kungsholm, Sankt Göran and Essinge. The population  is 54,283, of which 28,614 are female and 25,669 are male, on an area of 4.85 km², which gives a density of 10,977.73 per km².

Gallery

References

External links

Boroughs of Stockholm

hu:Kungsholmen (kerület)